Business & Hotel Management School (BHMS) is a private business & hospitality school with four campuses in Lucerne, Switzerland established in 1998.

History

B.H.M.S. is a member of the Bénédict Switzerland group of schools, founded in 1928. Bénédict School is a private educational organization which educates each year more than 15.000 full and part-time students.
B.H.M.S. was founded in 1998  as a branch of the Bénédict Schools in Switzerland located in St. Gallen, Zurich, Lucerne and Bern.

Programs

B.H.M.S. School provides undergraduate, graduate, and post graduate programs in the fields of Hotel Management, Culinary Arts, 
and Masters in Hospitality and Global Management.

History
1998 - BHMS was founded as a branch of Bénédict School, in Switzerland. Opening of BHMS Baselstrasse Campus.

2003 - Recognition of awards from Brighton University.

2007 - Collaborative agreement developed with Robert Gordon University.

2008 - First validation event to offer a Robert Gordon University program at B.H.M.S. Introduction of the first bachelor's degree in Hotel & Hospitality Management. Opening of BHMS Lakefront Centre Campus. BHMS receives the full accreditation by the ACFF (American Culinary Federation Foundation).

2011/2012 - Opening of BHMS St. Karli Quai Campus. Opening of BHMS Sentipark Campus.

2015 - Inauguration of a new BHMS Culinary Lab in Lucerne. Introduction of the new MSc in International Hospitality Business Management (RGU).

2016 - Introduction of the short-term Summer/Winter Courses. Introduction of the HF- Dipl. Hotelier Restaurateur program in German language. Opening of the BHMS 'City Campus' in Lucerne.

2018 - Appointment of New BHMS Director Beat Wicki. 2018 - Introduction of the new BHMS MBA Degrees in 3 specializations. 2018 - Introduction of the new MSc in Global Business Management (RGU).

Accreditation & memberships

While B.H.M.S is not itself accredited and delivers Swiss private degrees, most of its degrees are delivered through academic partnership with British universities Robert Gordon University, Aberdeen, York St John University and the University of Brighton.

Member of EURHODIP - The Leading Hotel Schools in Europe;

Member of the International Council on Hotel, Restaurant and Institutional Education (I-CHRIE);

Member of the American Hotel & Lodging Association;

Its Culinary program is accredited by the Accrediting Commission of the American Culinary Federation Foundation. It has also partnered up with Kalbis Institute, Jakarta, Indonesia for Culinary Arts.

Partnerships
In 2017, it partnered up with Atharva College of Hotel Management & Catering Technology, Mumbai, India. In the same year, it also partnered up with the Hong Kong Culinary Academy. 

In 2020, it partnered with Badr University, Cairo. In 2021, it partnered up with the ESF Hong Kong.

Rankings

In 2022, the QS World University Rankings rated B.H.M.S. full 5 stars.

Campuses

B.H.M.S. has 4 campuses located in the center of Lucerne city within a 5–15 minute walking distance from each other: 

Lakefront Center (Bénédict School and BHMS classrooms)

City Campus (the main student residence)

Sentipark (B.H.M.S. classroom building & student residence)

Baselstrasse 57 (B.H.M.S.classroom building & student residence).

References

Business schools in Switzerland
Educational institutions established in 1998
Hospitality schools in Switzerland
Cooking schools in Europe
1998 establishments in Switzerland
Education in Lucerne